The surname Turov (feminine: Turova) may refer to:
 Maxim Turov (born 1979), Russian chess player
 Irina Turova, Soviet sprinter
 Turau (surname), Belarusian-language form; may be used interchangeably with the Russian form for Belarusian persons

Russian-language surnames